Grgur is a Serbo-Croatian masculine given name, a variant of Greek Grēgorios (English: Gregory) meaning "watchful, alert". It has been used in Serbian society since the Middle Ages. It may refer to:

Grgur Ninski (fl. 925-929), Croatian bishop
Grgur III Šubić Bribirski (d. 1235), Croatian nobleman
Grgur Kurjaković (fl. 1325), Croatian nobleman
Grgur Preljub (1312–1355), Serbian nobleman
Grgur Golubić (fl. 1347-1361), Serbian nobleman
Grgur Branković (1415–1459), Serbian nobleman
Grgur Vukosalić (d. 1436), Serbian nobleman
Grgur Radoš (b. 1988), Croatian footballer

See also
Other Serbo-Croatian variants and diminutives include Grigorije, Grigor, Grga, etc.
Grgurević, surname
Grgić, surname
Sveti Grgur, an uninhabited island in Croatia
Grgurići, a village in Bosnia and Herzegovina

References

Sources
 

Serbian masculine given names
Croatian masculine given names